The AFF Beach Soccer Championship (or ASEAN Beach Soccer Championship) is an international beach soccer competition contested by Southeast Asian men's national teams who are members of the ASEAN Football Federation (AFF).

First held in 2014, the second edition of the tournament was due to be held in Vietnam from 5–13 August 2016, but was postponed due to financial restraints of the sponsors, FELDA, and eventually took place in Indonesia in 2018.

Results

Teams reaching top four

External links
 Official website

References 

 
AFF competitions
Beach soccer competitions